Richard Brind (died March 1718)  was an English organist and minor composer of the 17th century.

Biography
Born in England in the 1670s or 1680s, Brind was a chorister at St Paul's Cathedral as boy and young teenager. While there, he sang under the directorship of John Blow and Jeremiah Clarke. After Clarke's death in 1707, he was appointed vicar-choral and, while not succeeding him as Master of the Choristers, he did take over his post as organist at St Paul's. According to music historian Sir John Hawkins, Brind was "no very celebrated performer", and, although five anthems are listed in Divine Harmony (London, 1712), none of his compositions survives. He died in London, and is best remembered today as a teacher to composer Maurice Greene.

References

External links
The Musical Times, which has a reference to Richard Brind
Short bio
Oxford Biography Entry

English composers
English classical organists
British male organists
1718 deaths
Cathedral organists
Year of birth unknown
Male classical organists